Peekamoose Mountain is a mountain located in Ulster County, New York. 
The mountain is part of the Catskill Mountains.
Peekamoose Mountain is flanked to the north by Table Mountain. The name Peekamoose is possibly an anglicization of an Algonquin word meaning 'broken off smooth', cf. Poke-O-Moonshine Mountain.

Peekamoose Mountain stands within the watershed of Rondout Creek, a tributary of the Hudson River, which drains into New York Bay. 
The east and southeast slopes of Peekamoose Mtn. drain into Rondout Creek. 
The southwest end of Peekamoose drains into Buttermilk Falls Brook, thence into Rondout Creek. 
The west side of Peekamoose drains into Bear Hole Brook, thence into Rondout Creek.

Peekamoose Mountain is within the Slide Mountain Wilderness of New York's Catskill State Park. 

See also 
 List of mountains in New York

Notes

External links 
  Peakbagger.com: Peekamoose Mountain
  Catskill 3500 Club: Peekamoose Mountain
 

Catskill High Peaks
Mountains of Ulster County, New York
Mountains of New York (state)